Tata Engineering and Locomotive Company Club Ground or Telco Club Ground is a multi purpose stadium in Jamshedpur, Jharkhand. The ground is mainly used for organizing matches of football, cricket and other sports. The stadium has hosted nine List A matches  2004 when Assam cricket team played against Orissa cricket team but since then the stadium has hosted non-first-class matches.

References

External links 
 Cricketarchive
 Cricinfo

Tata Group
Cricket grounds in Jharkhand
Multi-purpose stadiums
Sport in Jamshedpur
Sports venues in Jharkhand
Sports venues completed in 1991
1991 establishments in Bihar
20th-century architecture in India